Los Alamos Technical Associates (LATA) is a diversified engineering, scientific, and technical services company serving a worldwide client base. Founded in 1976 in Los Alamos, New Mexico, US, LATA has offices nationwide with corporate offices in Albuquerque, New Mexico. LATA is an employee-owned company. Their work is in four primary service areas: nuclear, environmental, defense and security, and engineering.

Contracts
In February 2003, Los Alamos National Laboratory signed a contract with KSL Services Joint Venture where LATA was one of the three companies.

In January 2005, the Department of Energy announced a signing between LATA and Parallax Inc for a $141 million contract.

Locations
They currently have offices located in:
 Los Alamos, NM (HQ)
 Albuquerque, NM

 
 Ogden, UT
 Richland, WA
 Chicago, IL
 Columbus, OH

Washington, DC

References

External links
 

Companies based in New Mexico
Los Alamos, New Mexico